Waldemar Herdt (born 28 November 1962) is a German politician for the right-wing populist Alternative for Germany (AfD) party and former member of the Bundestag (2017–2021).

Life and politics

Herdt was born 1962 in Zhetikara District, Kazakh SSR, Soviet Union and a leading member of the factious and evangelical Party of Bible-abiding Christians before he entered the AfD in 2013.

Herdt became after the 2017 German federal election a member of the Bundestag.

References

1962 births
People from Kostanay Region
German evangelicals
Members of the Bundestag for Lower Saxony
Living people
Members of the Bundestag 2017–2021
Members of the Bundestag for the Alternative for Germany